Bühne is the name for the following German places:

 Bühne (Osterwieck), a part of the town Osterwieck, Saxony-Anhalt, Germany
 Bühne (Borgentreich), a part of the town Borgentreich, North Rhine-Westphalia, Germany

See also
 Buehner, a surname